Dare may refer to:

Places 
 Dare, East Timor, a city
 Darè, Italy, a commune
 Dare County, North Carolina, United States
 Dare, Virginia, United States, an unincorporated community

Name 
 Dare (name), a list of people and fictional characters with either the surname or given name

Arts and entertainment

Music 
 Dare (band), a band fronted by Darren Wharton
 Dare (album), a 1981 album by The Human League
 "Dare" (song), a 2005 song by Gorillaz
 "Dare", a song by Stan Bush from The Transformers The Movie: Original Motion Picture Soundtrack
 "Dare (La La La)", a 2014 song by Shakira

Other 
 Dare (film), a 2009 American romantic drama film
 Dare (novel), a 1965 novel by Philip José Farmer
 Dare, a 2007 novel by BET host Abiola Abrams
 Dare (graffiti artist)

In business 
 Dare Foods, a Canadian food company
 LG Dare, a smartphone

Acronyms 
 Dark Ages Radio Explorer, a proposed NASA mission
 Direct Agency / Rep Exchange, a protocol used by television stations and advertisement sales representatives
 Discrete Algebraic Riccati equation, a mathematical relationship
 Drug Abuse Resistance Education, an anti-drug program for students started in the United States
 Defence Avionics Research Establishment, an Indian national defence laboratory
 Dictionary of American Regional English, a dictionary of the different dialects of American English
 Digital Averroes Research Environment, a project to collect and edit the works of Averroes
 Database of Abstracts of Reviews of Effects, part of the Cochrane Library
 Delft Aerospace Rocket Engineering, a student rocketry team from The Netherlands

See also
 
 Truth or Dare (disambiguation)
 Dair, a letter of the Ogham alphabet
 Dáire or Dáre, an Old Irish name
 Dere or Deira, an ancient kingdom in what is now northern England